The 2021–22 Sam Houston State Bearkats men's basketball team represented Sam Houston State University in the 2021–22 NCAA Division I men's basketball season. They played their home games at the Bernard Johnson Coliseum in Huntsville, Texas and were led by 12th-year head coach Jason Hooten, as first-year members of the Western Athletic Conference.

Previous season
The Bearkats finished the 2020–21 season 19–9, 13–3 in Southland Conference play to finish in third place. They were upset by Lamar in the quarterfinals of the Southland tournament. This season was the Bearkats' last as members of the Southland Conference, as they joined the Western Athletic Conference for the 2021–22 season.

Roster

Schedule and results

|-
!colspan=12 style=| Non-conference regular season

|-
!colspan=12 style=| WAC regular season

|-
!colspan=9 style=|WAC tournament

Source

See also 
2021–22 Sam Houston State Bearkats women's basketball team

References

Sam Houston Bearkats men's basketball seasons
Sam Houston State Bearkats
Sam Houston State Bearkats men's basketball
Sam Houston State Bearkats men's basketball